World Health Organization Prizes and Awards are given to recognise major achievements in public health. The candidates are nominated and recommended by each prize and award selection panel. The WHO Executive Board selects the winners, which are presented during the World Health Assembly. Some of these awards are originally stated by WHO and other were inherited from the League of Nations.

Léon Bernard Foundation Prize 

Established in 1937 in memory of Professor Léon Bérard (1876–1960), one of the founders of the League of Nations, to celebrate outstanding service in the field of social medicine. The prize is awarded when there is enough funding, consisting of a bronze medal and a sum of 2500 CHF to be awarded to a person who has accomplished it.

Ihsan Doğramacı Family Health Foundation Prize 

Established in 1980 by Professor İhsan Doğramacı (1915–2010) to celebrate paediatricians and child health specialists who have given distinguished service in this field every two years. The prize consists of a gold-plated silver medal, a certificate, and an honorarium for services in the field of family health.

Sasakawa Health Prize 

On the idea and with financial support from Mr Ryōichi Sasakawa (1899–1995), Chairman of the Japan Shipbuilding Industry Foundation and President of the Sasakawa Memorial Health Foundation, the award was founded in 1984. The Sasakawa Health Prize consists of a statuette and money of the order of $30,000 USD to be given to a person(s) and/or of the order of $40,000 USD to be given to an institution(s), who have accomplished outstanding innovative work in health development, such as the promotion of specific health programmes or significant advancements in primary health care, to encourage the further development of health.

United Arab Emirates Health Foundation Prize 

The prize was established in 1993 under the directive of HM Sheikh Zayed Bin Sultan Al Nahayyan (1918–2004). The prize consists of a certified award, a plaque, and up to $40,000 USD. The prize can be awarded to more than one person or institution that has made an outstanding contribution to health development.

Sheikh Sabah Al-Ahmad Al-Jaber Al-Sabah Prize 

His Highness Sheikh Sabah Al-Ahmad Al-Jaber Al-Sabah (1929–2020) Prize is awarded for research in health care for the elderly and health promotion by the State of Kuwait Health Promotion Foundation to the individual(s) or institution(s). The prize consists of a certificate of achievement, a plaque from the organization's founder, and an amount of money that cannot exceed $40,000 USD.

Lee Jong-wook Memorial Prize for Public Health 

Established in 2008 in memory of Lee Jong-wook (1945–2006) to celebrate outstanding contributions to public health that went beyond the call of normal duties. The prize consists of a plaque and a sum of money which will not exceed $100,000 USD.

Nelson Mandela Award for Health Promotion 
The award, which embraces Nelson Mandela’s (1918–2013) humility, was established in 2019 to celebrate a person(s) or institution(s) that made a significant contribution to health promotion extended far beyond the call of normal duties. The award consists of a plaque.

Past recipients

A.T. Shousha Foundation Prize and Fellowship 

In 1966, the 9th World Health Assembly established a foundation bearing Aly Tewfik Shousha (1891–1964) to honour the memory as one of the World Health Organization founders and first WHO Regional Director for the Eastern Mediterranean. The foundation's purpose is to award a prize known as the Shousha Prize, which is to be given to a person who made the most significant contribution to any health problem in the geographical area in which Shousha served the WHO. The foundation also gives a Fellowship every 6 years that amounts to $15,000 USD.

The Down Syndrome Research Prize in the Eastern Mediterranean Region 
The prize was founded in 1998 to promote the study of Down Syndrome. Abdul Rahman Abdulla Al-Awadi, head of the Islamic Organization for Medical Sciences, came up with the idea and donated the funding after taking into account the high frequency of Down syndrome in the Eastern Mediterranean region. The award, which consists of a bronze medal and the current equivalent of $2,000 USD, is given to one or more individuals who have distinguished themselves in Down syndrome research. The prize has been given out every two years since 2000.

Past recipients

The State of Kuwait Prize for the Control of Cancer, Cardiovascular Diseases and Diabetes in the Eastern Mediterranean Region 

The Foundation was formed in 2003 by the State of Kuwait and awarded an individual who has made an exceptional contribution to the prevention, control, or study of diabetes, cardiovascular disease, or cancer. The prize, which consists of a bronze medal and an amount of money estimated to be worth $5,000 USD, can be awarded to one or more people once a year.

Francesco Pocchiari Fellowship 
Established in 1991 in memory of Professor  (1924–1989), former Director-General of the Istituto Superiore di Sanità, with funds from the Italian Government. The prize awards $10,000 USD travelling fellowships to keen researchers from developing countries to enable them to gain experience researching health issues that relate to developing countries.

Past recipients

Dissolved prizes

The Darling Foundation Prize 

The Darling Foundation was established in 1929 in honour of eminent malaria expert Samuel Taylor Darling (1872–1925), who died tragically while participating in a study expedition for the League of Nations' Malaria Commission. In 1948, WHO acquired control of the Foundation. A bronze medal and a fixed amount of 2500 CHF make up the Darling Foundation Prize, which is given for exceptional work in the pathology, aetiology, epidemiology, treatment, prevention, or control of malaria. It was discontinued in 2000.

Jacques Parisot Foundation Fellowship 

The Foundation was founded in 1969 by Mrs Parisot in honour of Professor Jacques Parisot (1882–1967), who was a founding member of WHO and signed the Organization's Constitution on behalf of France at the 1946 International Health Conference in New York. The Foundation's goal is to promote social medicine or public health research by providing fellowships, which are given out every two years (even years). A bronze medal and a value of $5,000 USD make up the prize. It was discontinued in 2015.

Comlan A.A. Quenum Prize for Public Health 
The prize is funded by the Government of Cameroon and consists of a bronze medal and a reward of $2,000 USD. The prize was awarded every two years until it was discontinued in 2000.

Past recipients

References 

World Health Organization
Public health
WHO laureates